Modicus is a genus of clingfishes endemic to the shores of New Zealand.

Characteristics
The genus Modicus is distinguished from closely related genera by the possession of well-developed gill rakers; rays in the pectoral fin; and by having their teeth clustered at the front of either jaw, each jaw having up to two well-developed canines with the lower jaw having a single row of backward curving teeth.  There are gill filaments on the first 3 gill arches and the gill membranes are fused medially with the isthmus. The sucker is a double disc formed by the fused pelvic fins.

Species
There are currently two recognized species in this genus:
 Modicus minimus Hardy, 1983
 Modicus tangaroa Hardy, 1983

References

 
Gobiesocidae
Endemic marine fish of New Zealand
Marine fish genera